Sean Welch (born 12 April 1965, Enfield, England) was the bassist for The Beautiful South and previously roadie for The Housemartins.

References 

1965 births
Living people
English bass guitarists
English male guitarists
Male bass guitarists
People from Enfield, London